Leo Van der Elst (born 7 January 1962) is a Belgian retired footballer who played mainly as a defensive midfielder.

He amassed Belgian Pro League totals of 406 games and 67 goals over the course of 15 seasons, mainly in representation of Antwerp, Club Brugge and Genk. His older brother, François, was also a professional footballer, and both were Belgian internationals.

Football career
Van der Elst was born in Opwijk. During his career he played for Royal Antwerp FC, Club Brugge KV (where he often partnered namesake Franky, contributing with five goals in 30 games to the conquest of the 1987–88 edition of the Belgian First Division A), FC Metz, RKC Waalwijk, R. Charleroi SC, K.R.C. Genk and V.C. Eendracht Aalst 2002, retiring in 1995 at 33; subsequently, he began a coaching career.

Van der Elst earned 13 caps for Belgium and was selected, alongside Franky, to the 1986 FIFA World Cup. There, in the quarter-final clash against Spain, he scored the penalty shootout decider after the 1–1 in regulation time.

Honours

Club 
Club Brugge

 Belgian Pro League: 1987–88
 Belgian Cup: 1985–85
 Belgian Supercup: 1986
 Bruges Matins: 1984

International 
Belgium

 FIFA World Cup: 1986 (fourth place)

Individual 

 Man of the Season (Belgian First Division): 1989–90

References

External links

1962 births
Living people
Flemish sportspeople
Belgian footballers
Association football midfielders
Belgian Pro League players
Royal Antwerp F.C. players
Club Brugge KV players
R. Charleroi S.C. players
K.R.C. Genk players
S.C. Eendracht Aalst players
Ligue 1 players
FC Metz players
Eredivisie players
RKC Waalwijk players
Belgium international footballers
1986 FIFA World Cup players
Belgian expatriate footballers
Expatriate footballers in France
Expatriate footballers in the Netherlands
Belgian football managers
K.V. Oostende managers
S.C. Eendracht Aalst managers